KEJB (1480 AM) is a radio station broadcasting an oldies format. Licensed to Eureka, California, United States, it serves the Eureka area. The station is currently owned by Bicoastal Media Licenses II, LLC.

The station is the North Coast's oldest continuously operating radio station. It signed on in 1933 as KIEM. It gradually spawned the area's first television station, KIEM-TV. The radio side changed its calls to KRED in 1961, but remained a sister station to KIEM-TV until the two stations were sold to separate owners in the 1970s.

The station's previous KGOE call letters come from a previous format, a full-time simulcast of San Francisco talk radio station KGO AM 810.

On February 1, 2023, KGOE changed their format from progressive talk to oldies, branded as "The Jukebox" under new KEJB call letters.

References

External links

EJB
Oldies radio stations in the United States
Mass media in Humboldt County, California
Radio stations established in 1933
1933 establishments in California